Ramularia macrospora is a fungal plant pathogen infecting bellflowers.

References

Fungal plant pathogens and diseases
Ornamental plant pathogens and diseases
macrospora
Fungi described in 1863